Hoover High School, often referred to as North Canton Hoover, is a public high school in North Canton, Ohio, United States.

Name
The school's original name was North Canton High School which students referred to as "No. Ca. Hi." In 1957, a new high school building was named in dedication to local resident William Henry "Boss" Hoover, founder of The Hoover Company.

Academics
Hoover High School had an "A" achievement rating for the 2013–2014 school year on their Ohio Report Card and also an "A" for graduation rate.

Athletics

Hoover athletics teams compete as a member of the Ohio High School Athletic Association (OHSAA) and as a member of the Federal League. 
Hoover's girls softball team has won the state championship eight times, in 1998, 1999, 2006, 2008, 2011, 2012, 2013 and 2014. In addition, the girls cross country team placed second in the state championships in 2008.
The boys lacrosse team won the Ohio High School Lacrosse Association (non-OHSAA) state championship in 2006, going 18-2 overall. The Hoover girls lacrosse team finished second in the state in 2010 and again in 2011.

In 1985, the Vikings reached the state finals in football and state was state runner-up in basketball. The baseball team reached the Ohio Final Four in 1992 and 1999. Since joining the Federal League in 1968, the Hoover football program has claimed 22 Federal League Championships.
 
The Hoover High track & field team has also had success over the years, producing three individual state champions.

State championships
 Boys basketball – 1939 (When known as North Canton H.S.)
 Girls basketball - 2002
 Softball – 1998, 1999, 2006, 2008, 2011, 2012, 2013, 2014
 Wrestling – 1965

Music
Hoover High School has a music program which is split into instrumental and vocal music departments.

The instrumental music department consists of many performing ensembles. In fall, the band members participate in the Viking Marching Band which marches in all Hoover football games, OMEA marching competitions, and the Pro Football Hall of Fame Grand Parade. The band received an 'Excellent' rating at the OMEA state finals adjudicated competition in 2013, 2014, and 2015. In 2016, 2018, 2019, and 2021, they received a 'Superior' rating. When football season ends, the band splits up into a Concert Band (C) and a Symphonic Band (AA). Both bands have consistently received superior ratings at OMEA non-marching competitions. Other ensembles in the instrumental department include Pep Band, two Jazz Bands, String Orchestra, and Full Orchestra as well as numerous small ensembles. The band and orchestra students take trips to places such as Walt Disney World every two years.

The choirs in the vocal department are the Freshman Choir, A-Cappella Choir, Hi-Notes, Lo-Notes, Women's Chorale, and the elite Hi-Lo's ensemble. Along with these choirs, the vocal music department puts on an annual musical. They also put on the annual May Fiesta concert which highlights all ensembles in the district as well as musical numbers by the years' seniors.

Notable alumni
 Austin Appleby, professional football player
 Todd Blackledge, professional football player in the National Football League (NFL) and sports broadcaster
 Sarah Matthews (deputy press secretary) deputy press secretary President Trump
 Eddie McClintock, actor
 Jeffrey Mylett, actor and songwriter
 Dick Snyder, professional basketball player in the National Basketball Association (NBA)
 Rabbit Warstler, professional baseball player in Major League Baseball
 Jud Logan, 4-time Olympian and former American Record holder in the hammer throw. Also former head track and field coach at Ashland University.

Notes and references

External links
 

High schools in Stark County, Ohio
Educational institutions established in 1929
Public high schools in Ohio
1929 establishments in Ohio